OTO Award TV Journalism

Currently held by Patrik Herman

First awarded | Last awarded 2000 | Present 

OTO Award for TV Journalism has been awarded since the first edition of the accolades, established by Art Production Agency (APA) in Slovakia in 2000. Each year, the award has been presented to the most recognized television journalists of the past year with the ceremony permitted live by the national television network STV.

Winners and nominees

2000s

2010s

Superlatives

 Notes
┼ Denotes also or a winner in two or more of the main categories.

References

External links
 OTO Awards (Official website)
 OTO Awards - Winners and nominees (From 2000 onwards)
 OTO Awards - Winners and nominees (From 2000 to 2009)

Journalism
Slovak culture
Slovak television awards
Awards established in 2000